The Steinhüshorn (or Steinhaushorn) is a mountain of the Urner Alps, overlooking Guttannen in the Bernese Oberland. It lies north of the Diechterhorn and west of the Trift Glacier.

References

External links
Steinhüshorn on Summitpost
Steinhüshorn on Hikr

Mountains of the Alps
Alpine three-thousanders
Mountains of Switzerland
Mountains of the canton of Bern